Kim Yong-chul (17 December 1924 – 14 March 2023) was a South Korean jurist and judge. He served as Chief Justice of the Supreme Court of Korea from 1986 to 1988.

Kim died on 14 March 2023, at the age of 98.

References

1924 births
2023 deaths
20th-century South Korean lawyers
Chief justices of the Supreme Court of Korea
Seoul National University School of Law alumni
People from North Gyeongsang Province
Gwangsan Kim clan